The 1995–96 NBA season was the Lakers' 48th season in the National Basketball Association, and 36th in the city of Los Angeles. It was also the highlight of retired All-Star guard and Lakers legend Magic Johnson making a comeback. During the off-season, the team signed free agents Corie Blount and Derek Strong. The Lakers got off to a slow start losing three of their first four games, but soon recovered holding a 24–18 record before Johnson's arrival on January 30, 1996, in a 128–118 home victory over the Golden State Warriors; Magic had 19 points, 8 rebounds, 10 assists and 2 steals in 27 minutes off the bench. The Lakers won ten of their twelve games in February, which included an 8-game winning streak, and held a 28–19 record at the All-Star break.

However, in March, after a game against the Seattle SuperSonics, scoring leader Cedric Ceballos missed the team's charter flight to Seattle without explanation, as the Lakers were scheduled to play the Sonics again; Ceballos went missing for a few days, and was suspended without pay. Their troubles continued as Nick Van Exel shoved a referee during a road game against the Denver Nuggets on April 9, and was suspended for the final seven games of the regular season. Magic was also suspended for three games for bumping into a referee during a home game against the Phoenix Suns on April 14. The Lakers finished second in the Pacific Division with a 53–29 record.

Ceballos averaged 21.2 points and 6.9 rebounds per game, while Van Exel provided the team with 14.9 points and 6.9 assists per game, and Johnson played a sixth man role, averaging 14.6 points, 5.7 rebounds and 6.9 assists per game off the bench in 32 games, starting in just nine of them. He also finished in fifth place in Sixth Man of the Year voting. In addition, Elden Campbell averaged 13.9 points, 7.6 rebounds and 2.6 blocks per game, while Vlade Divac provided with 12.9 points, 8.6 rebounds and 1.7 blocks per game, and second-year guard Eddie Jones contributed 12.8 points and 1.8 steals per game. Off the bench, Anthony Peeler contributed 9.7 points per game, and Sedale Threatt provided with 7.3 points and 3.3 assists per game.

However, in the Western Conference First Round of the playoffs, the Lakers lost to the 5th-seeded, and reigning champion Houston Rockets in four games; after the defeat, Magic decided to retire for the second time and for good. Following the season, Divac was traded to the Charlotte Hornets in exchange for 1996 NBA draftee, and high school basketball star Kobe Bryant, while Peeler and George Lynch were both dealt to the Vancouver Grizzlies, Strong signed as a free agent with the Orlando Magic, and Threatt was released to free agency.

NBA Draft

Roster

Regular season

Magic's Comeback
In the 1995–96 NBA season, Johnson made a short-lived second comeback as a player from January 1996 to May 1996. In this time, he had bulked up from his self-reported weight of 235 lb in 1992, to 255 lb in order to play power forward, a much more physical position than his usual point guard role. At age 36, Johnson played the last 32 games of the season, averaging 14.6 points, 6.9 assists, and 5.7 rebounds per game. The Lakers lost to the Houston Rockets in the first round of the playoffs, and Johnson retired for good. Johnson explained his comeback with the words: "I'm going out on my terms, something I couldn't say when I aborted a comeback in 1992."

Season standings

Record vs. opponents

Game log

Regular Season

|- style="background:#cfc;"
| 1
| November 3
| Denver
| W 98-96
| Cedric Ceballos (26)
| Vlade Divac (10)
| Nick Van Exel (7)
| Great Western Forum16,345
| 1-0
|- style="background:#fcc;"
| 2
| November 4
| @ Seattle
| L 89-103
| Elden Campbell (24)
| Elden Campbell (14)
| 3 players tied (2)
| KeyArena17,102
| 1-1
|- style="background:#fcc;"
| 3
| November 7
| @ Minnesota
| L 92-93
| Cedric Ceballos (27)
| 3 players tied (6)
| Nick Van Exel (10)
| Target Center14,756
| 1-2
|- style="background:#fcc;"
| 4
| November 8
| @ Utah
| L 98-108
| Cedric Ceballos (26)
| Cedric Ceballos (10)
| Nick Van Exel (7)
| Delta Center19,911
| 1-3
|- style="background:#cfc;"
| 5
| November 10
| Seattle
| W 100-97
| Cedric Ceballos (32)
| Cedric Ceballos (12)
| Sedale Threatt (7)
| Great Western Forum15,542
| 2-3
|- style="background:#fcc;"
| 6
| November 11
| @ Golden State
| L 105-123
| Cedric Ceballos (25)
| Cedric Ceballos (15)
| Nick Van Exel (6)
| Oakland-Alameda County Coliseum Arena15,025
| 2-4
|- style="background:#cfc;"
| 7
| November 14
| @ Sacramento
| W 106-100
| Cedric Ceballos (31)
| Elden Campbell (12)
| Sedale Threatt (8)
| ARCO Arena17,317
| 3-4
|- style="background:#cfc;"
| 8
| November 15
| Dallas
| W 114-97
| Cedric Ceballos (31)
| Cedric Ceballos (13)
| Nick Van Exel (12)
| Great Western Forum11,381
| 4-4
|- style="background:#cfc;"
| 9
| November 17
| @ Vancouver
| W 114-91
| Nick Van Exel (25)
| Cedric Ceballos (8)
| Sedale Threatt (7)
| General Motors Place19,193
| 5-4
|- style="background:#cfc;"
| 10
| November 19
| L.A. Clippers
| W 109-88
| Cedric Ceballos (25)
| Cedric Ceballos (13)
| Nick Van Exel (9)
| Great Western Forum15,617
| 6-4
|- style="background:#fcc;"
| 11
| November 21
| Portland
| L 108-109
| Cedric Ceballos (38)
| Vlade Divac (16)
| Nick Van Exel (15)
| Great Western Forum10,836
| 6-5
|- style="background:#fcc;"
| 12
| November 24
| Sacramento
| L 98-99
| Cedric Ceballos (23)
| Cedric Ceballos (11)
| Nick Van Exel (8)
| Great Western Forum16,343
| 6-6
|- style="background:#fcc;"
| 13
| November 25
| @ Phoenix
| L 113-114
| Cedric Ceballos (34)
| Elden Campbell (10)
| Nick Van Exel (7)
| American West Arena19,023
| 6-7
|- style="background:#cfc;"
| 14
| November 29
| Phoenix
| W 107-96
| Cedric Ceballos (24)
| 3 players tied (9)
| 3 players tied (6)
| Great Western Forum13,484
| 7-7

|- style="background:#cfc;"
| 15
| December 1
| Vancouver
| W 113-100
| Cedric Ceballos (22)
| Vlade Divac (13)
| Nick Van Exel (16)
| Great Western Forum12,426
| 8-7
|- style="background:#cfc;"
| 16
| December 3
| Indiana
| W 104-96
| Nick Van Exel (26)
| Elden Campbell (10)
| Threatt & Van Exel (5)
| Great Western Forum14,223
| 9-7
|- style="background:#fcc;"
| 17
| December 5
| @ San Antonio
| L 89-117
| Cedric Ceballos (16)
| Cedric Ceballos (7)
| 3 players tied (4)
| Alamodome14,551
| 9-8
|- style="background:#fcc;"
| 18
| December 6
| @ Houston
| L 99-112
| Cedric Ceballos (27)
| Cedric Ceballos (17)
| Sedale Threatt (9)
| The Summit16,285
| 9-9
|- style="background:#cfc;"
| 19
| December 8
| Toronto
| W 120-103
| Jones & Threatt (27)
| Elden Campbell (12)
| Eddie Jones (11)
| Great Western Forum12,982
| 10-9
|- style="background:#cfc;"
| 20
| December 10
| Detroit
| W 87-82
| Cedric Ceballos (22)
| Vlade Divac (13)
| Divac & Van Exel (6)
| Great Western Forum16,176
| 11-9
|- style="background:#fcc;"
| 21
| December 12
| @ New York
| L 82-97
| Cedric Ceballos (26)
| Cedric Ceballos (9)
| Nick Van Exel (9)
| Madison Square Garden19,763
| 11-10
|- style="background:#cfc;"
| 22
| December 13
| @ Detroit
| W 101-98
| Nick Van Exel (30)
| Campbell & Ceballos (8)
| Nick Van Exel (7)
| The Palace of Auburn Hills14,579
| 12-10
|- style="background:#fcc;"
| 23
| December 15
| @ Washington
| L 114-122
| Cedric Ceballos (33)
| Elden Campbell (8)
| Nick Van Exel (9)
| US Airways Arena18,756
| 12-11
|- style="background:#fcc;"
| 24
| December 16
| @ Chicago
| L 88-108
| Cedric Ceballos (27)
| Cedric Ceballos (9)
| Sedale Threatt (4)
| United Center23,824
| 12-12
|- style="background:#cfc;"
| 25
| December 19
| @ Milwaukee
| W 109-105
| Nick Van Exel (24)
| Elden Campbell (9)
| Nick Van Exel (7)
| Bradley Center14,488
| 13-12
|- style="background:#fcc;"
| 26
| December 20
| @ Indiana
| L 98-109
| Nick Van Exel (20)
| Vlade Divac (12)
| Nick Van Exel (7)
| Market Square Arena15,870
| 13-13
|- style="background:#cfc;"
| 27
| December 22
| Sacramento
| W 116-83
| Cedric Ceballos (27)
| Elden Campbell (12)
| Threatt & Van Exel (9)
| Great Western Forum16,189
| 14-13
|- style="background:#cfc;"
| 28
| December 23
| @ Portland
| W 102-99
| Cedric Ceballos (24)
| Cedric Ceballos (11)
| Peeler & Threatt (5)
| Rose Garden21,401
| 15-13
|- style="background:#cfc;"
| 29
| December 26
| Boston
| W 102-91
| Eddie Jones (19)
| Vlade Divac (11)
| Nick Van Exel (9)
| Great Western Forum14,324
| 16-13
|- style="background:#fcc;"
| 30
| December 28
| San Antonio
| L 99-107
| Elden Campbell (25)
| Elden Campbell (9)
| Eddie Jones (9)
| Great Western Forum17,505
| 16-14
|- style="background:#fcc;"
| 31
| December 30
| @ Utah
| L 82-99
| Cedric Ceballos (18)
| Derek Strong (11)
| Eddie Jones (7)
| Delta Center19,911
| 16-15

|- style="background:#fcc;"
| 32
| January 2
| Philadelphia
| L 89-90
| Nick Van Exel (27)
| Vlade Divac (14)
| Nick Van Exel (9)
| Great Western Forum11,874
| 16-16
|- style="background:#cfc;"
| 33
| January 5
| Utah
| W 116-100
| Cedric Ceballos (28)
| Divac & Jones (7)
| Jones & Van Exel (8)
| Great Western Forum16,369
| 17-16
|- style="background:#fcc;"
| 34
| January 7
| Denver
| L 93-96
| Vlade Divac (21)
| Campbell & Divac (9)
| Nick Van Exel (10)
| Great Western Forum13,845
| 17-17
|- style="background:#cfc;"
| 35
| January 9
| Minnesota
| W 106-104
| Cedric Ceballos (29)
| Corie Blount (9)
| Nick Van Exel (9)
| Great Western Forum10,755
| 18-17
|- style="background:#cfc;"
| 36
| January 12
| Houston
| W 101-100
| Vlade Divac (25)
| Vlade Divac (11)
| Nick Van Exel (11)
| Great Western Forum17,505
| 19-17
|- style="background:#cfc;"
| 37
| January 15
| Miami
| W 96-88
| Eddie Jones (20)
| Vlade Divac (17)
| Nick Van Exel (6)
| Great Western Forum14,109
| 20-17
|- style="background:#cfc;"
| 38
| January 19
| @ L.A. Clippers
| W 106-100
| Cedric Ceballos (25)
| George Lynch (7)
| 3 players tied (4)
| Los Angeles Memorial Sports Arena14,018
| 21-17
|- style="background:#fcc;"
| 39
| January 20
| Cleveland
| L 82-93
| Nick Van Exel (17)
| George Lynch (9)
| Nick Van Exel (5)
| Great Western Forum15,380
| 21-18
|- style="background:#cfc;"
| 40
| January 24
| @ Boston
| W 124-107
| Elden Campbell (26)
| Vlade Divac (11)
| Divac & Van Exel (5)
| Fleet Center18,624
| 22-18
|- style="background:#cfc;"
| 41
| January 26
| @ Philadelphia
| W 100-88
| Cedric Ceballos (31)
| Elden Campbell (18)
| Vlade Divac (7)
| CoreStates Spectrum16,129
| 23-18
|- style="background:#cfc;"
| 42
| January 27
| @ New Jersey
| W 100-98
| Cedric Ceballos (29)
| Elden Campbell (13)
| Nick Van Exel (13)
| Continental Airlines Arena20,049
| 24-18
|- style="background:#cfc;"
| 43
| January 30
| Golden State
| W 128-118
| Cedric Ceballos (33)
| Campbell & Divac (9)
| Magic Johnson (10)
| Great Western Forum17,505
| 25-18

|- style="background:#fcc;"
| 44
| February 2
| Chicago
| L 84-99
| Cedric Ceballos (23)
| Elden Campbell (11)
| Nick Van Exel (11)
| Great Western Forum17,505
| 25-19
|- style="background:#cfc;"
| 45
| February 4
| Utah
| W 110-103
| Magic Johnson (21)
| Vlade Divac (11)
| Nick Van Exel (9)
| Great Western Forum17,505
| 26-19
|- style="background:#cfc;"
| 46
| February 6
| @ Denver
| W 99-78
| Cedric Ceballos (27)
| Vlade Divac (12)
| Magic Johnson (12)
| McNichols Sports Arena17,171
| 27-19
|- style="background:#cfc;"
| 47
| February 7
| New Jersey
| W 106-96
| Elden Campbell (19)
| Elden Campbell (10)
| Nick Van Exel (9)
| Great Western Forum16,481
| 28-19
|- align="center"
|colspan="9" bgcolor="#bbcaff"|All-Star Break
|- style="background:#cfc;"
|- bgcolor="#bbffbb"
|- style="background:#cfc;"
| 48
| February 14
| Atlanta
| W 87-86
| Elden Campbell (20)
| Magic Johnson (10)
| Magic Johnson (13)
| Great Western Forum16,792
| 29-19
|- style="background:#cfc;"
| 49
| February 16
| Dallas
| W 119-114
| Magic Johnson (30)
| Cedric Ceballos (11)
| Magic Johnson (11)
| Great Western Forum17,505
| 30-19
|- style="background:#cfc;"
| 50
| February 20
| L.A. Clippers
| W 121-104
| Vlade Divac (29)
| Cedric Ceballos (10)
| Nick Van Exel (11)
| Great Western Forum17,037
| 31-19
|- style="background:#cfc;"
| 51
| February 21
| @ L.A. Clippers
| W 112-108
| Cedric Ceballos (23)
| Elden Campbell (10)
| Nick Van Exel (7)
| Los Angeles Memorial Sports Arena16,021
| 32-19
|- style="background:#cfc;"
| 52
| February 23
| @ Dallas
| W 114-88
| Cedric Ceballos (27)
| Vlade Divac (18)
| Nick Van Exel (10)
| Reunion Arena17,502
| 33-19
|- style="background:#fcc;"
| 53
| February 24
| @ Houston
| L 94-96
| Cedric Ceballos (26)
| Vlade Divac (12)
| Nick Van Exel (7)
| The Summit16,285
| 33-20
|- style="background:#cfc;"
| 54
| February 26
| New York
| W 114-96
| Cedric Ceballos (27)
| Elden Campbell (10)
| Nick Van Exel (9)
| Great Western Forum17,505
| 34-20
|- style="background:#cfc;"
| 55
| February 28
| @ Vancouver
| W 99-80
| Cedric Ceballos (23)
| Vlade Divac (17)
| Elden Campbell (8)
| General Motors Place19,193
| 35-20

|- style="background:#cfc;"
| 56
| March 1
| Washington
| W 100-95
| Cedric Ceballos (27)
| Elden Campbell (12)
| Nick Van Exel (4)
| Great Western Forum16,943
| 36-20
|- style="background:#fcc;"
| 57
| March 3
| Houston
| L 107-111
| Nick Van Exel (21)
| Elden Campbell (11)
| Magic Johnson (5)
| Great Western Forum17,505
| 36-21
|- style="background:#cfc;"
| 58
| March 7
| @ Sacramento
| W 102-89
| Elden Campbell (29)
| Elden Campbell (11)
| Magic Johnson (7)
| ARCO Arena17,317
| 37-21
|- style="background:#cfc;"
| 59
| March 8
| @ Phoenix
| W 119-97
| Nick Van Exel (28)
| Vlade Divac (14)
| Nick Van Exel (13)
| American West Arena19,023
| 38-21
|- style="background:#fcc;"
| 60
| March 12
| Portland
| L 99-105
| Elden Campbell (26)
| Elden Campbell (11)
| Johnson & Van Exel (8)
| Great Western Forum16,971
| 38-22
|- style="background:#cfc;"
| 61
| March 14
| @ Golden State
| W 106-103
| Magic Johnson (21)
| Cedric Ceballos (9)
| Nick Van Exel (7)
| Oakland-Alameda County Coliseum Arena15,025
| 39-22
|- style="background:#cfc;"
| 62
| March 15
| Milwaukee
| W 117-95
| Magic Johnson (20)
| Vlade Divac (15)
| Magic Johnson (8)
| Great Western Forum17,505
| 40-22
|- style="background:#fcc;"
| 63
| March 17
| Orlando
| L 97-98
| Campbell & Van Exel (22)
| Elden Campbell (10)
| Johnson & Van Exel (5)
| Great Western Forum17,505
| 40-23
|- style="background:#cfc;"
| 64
| March 19
| Seattle
| W 94-71
| Eddie Jones (26)
| Elden Campbell (10)
| Magic Johnson (10)
| Great Western Forum17,505
| 41-23
|- style="background:#fcc;"
| 65
| March 21
| @ Seattle
| L 93-104
| Nick Van Exel (26)
| Vlade Divac (9)
| Vlade Divac (4)
| KeyArena17,072
| 41-24
|- style="background:#fcc;"
| 66
| March 24
| Charlotte
| L 94-103
| Magic Johnson (28)
| Campbell & Johnson (8)
| Nick Van Exel (7)
| Great Western Forum17,505
| 41-25
|- style="background:#cfc;"
| 67
| March 26
| @ Orlando
| W 113-91
| Nick Van Exel (22)
| Elden Campbell (10)
| Magic Johnson (7)
| Orlando Arena17,248
| 42-25
|- style="background:#cfc;"
| 68
| March 27
| @ Miami
| W 106-95
| Magic Johnson (27)
| Vlade Divac (12)
| Magic Johnson (9)
| Miami Arena15,200
| 43-25
|- style="background:#cfc;"
| 69
| March 29
| @ Atlanta
| W 102-89
| Anthony Peeler (25)
| Magic Johnson (10)
| Magic Johnson (9)
| Omni Coliseum16,378
| 44-25
|- style="background:#cfc;"
| 70
| March 31
| @ Toronto
| W 111-106
| Vlade Divac (20)
| Vlade Divac (19)
| Magic Johnson (6)
| SkyDome36,046
| 45-25

|- style="background:#fcc;"
| 71
| April 2
| @ Charlotte
| L 97-102
| Cedric Ceballos (35)
| Cedric Ceballos (11)
| Magic Johnson (10)
| Charlotte Coliseum24,042
| 45-26
|- style="background:#fcc;"
| 72
| April 3
| @ Cleveland
| L 89-105
| Magic Johnson (26)
| Magic Johnson (8)
| Nick Van Exel (8)
| Gund Arena20,562
| 45-27
|- style="background:#cfc;"
| 73
| April 5
| Vancouver
| W 104-94
| Eddie Jones (26)
| Vlade Divac (10)
| Vlade Divac (13)
| Great Western Forum17,505
| 46-27
|- style="background:#cfc;"
| 74
| April 7
| San Antonio
| W 107-97
| Divac & Jones (19)
| Vlade Divac (11)
| Magic Johnson (7)
| Great Western Forum17,130
| 47-27
|- style="background:#fcc;"
| 75
| April 9
| @ Denver
| L 91-98
| Vlade Divac (19)
| Vlade Divac (9)
| 3 players tied (4)
| McNichols Sports Arena17,171
| 47-28
|- style="background:#cfc;"
| 76
| April 10
| @ Minnesota
| W 111-90
| Elden Campbell (28)
| Magic Johnson (10)
| Magic Johnson (11)
| Target Center19,006
| 48-28
|- style="background:#cfc;"
| 77
| April 12
| Golden State
| W 94-81
| Vlade Divac (26)
| Vlade Divac (10)
| Magic Johnson (9)
| Great Western Forum17,505
| 49-28
|- style="background:#cfc;"
| 78
| April 14
| Phoenix
| W 118-114
| Cedric Ceballos (23)
| Vlade Divac (13)
| Jones & Threatt (7)
| Great Western Forum17,505
| 50-28
|- style="background:#cfc;"
| 79
| April 16
| @ Dallas
| W 113-95
| Cedric Ceballos (23)
| Elden Campbell (9)
| Elden Campbell (9)
| Reunion Arena17,502
| 51-28
|- style="background:#fcc;"
| 80
| April 18
| @ San Antonio
| L 100-103
| Elden Campbell (27)
| Vlade Divac (10)
| Sedale Threatt (8)
| Alamodome22,184
| 51-29
|- style="background:#cfc;"
| 81
| April 20
| Minnesota
| W 106-82
| Cedric Ceballos (36)
| Derek Strong (10)
| Eddie Jones (8)
| Great Western Forum17,505
| 52-29
|- style="background:#cfc;"
| 82
| April 21
| @ Portland
| W 92-88
| Jones & Peeler (20)
| Cedric Ceballos (7)
| Magic Johnson (10)
| Rose Garden21,401
| 53-29

Playoffs

|- style="background:#fcc;"
| 1
| April 25
| Houston
| L 83–87
| Cedric Ceballos (22)
| Magic Johnson (13)
| Nick Van Exel (8)
| Great Western Forum17,505
| 0–1
|- style="background:#cfc;"
| 2
| April 27
| Houston
| W 104–94
| Magic Johnson (26)
| Vlade Divac (12)
| Magic Johnson (5)
| Great Western Forum17,505
| 1–1
|- style="background:#fcc;"
| 3
| April 30
| @ Houston
| L 98–104
| Elden Campbell (18)
| Elden Campbell (10)
| Magic Johnson (13)
| The Summit16,285
| 1–2
|- style="background:#fcc;"
| 4
| May 2
| @ Houston
| L 94–102
| Cedric Ceballos (25)
| Cedric Ceballos (12)
| Nick Van Exel (11)
| The Summit16,285
| 1–3
|-

Player statistics

NOTE: Please write the players statistics in alphabetical order by last name.

Season

Playoffs

Award winners

Salaries

Player Salaries Citation:

Transactions

References

 Lakers on Database Basketball
 Lakers on Basketball Reference

Los Angeles Lakers seasons
Los Angle
Los Angle
Los Angle